War is the third studio album by Irish rock band U2. It was produced by Steve Lillywhite, and was released on 28 February 1983 on Island Records. The album is regarded as U2's first overtly political album, in part because of songs like "Sunday Bloody Sunday" and "New Year's Day", as well as the title, which stems from the band's perception of the world at the time; lead vocalist Bono stated that "war seemed to be the motif for 1982."

U2 recorded the album from September–November 1982 at Windmill Lane Studios with Lillywhite producing, the group's third consecutive album made at the studio with the producer. While the central themes of U2's previous albums Boy and October were adolescence and spirituality, respectively, War focused on both the physical aspects of warfare, and the emotional after-effects. Musically, it is also harsher than the band's previous releases. The album has been described as the record where the band "turned pacifism itself into a crusade."

War was a commercial success, knocking Michael Jackson's Thriller from the top of the UK charts to become U2's first number-one album there. In the United States, it reached number 12 and became the band's first album certified gold. War received generally favourable reviews, although some British journalists criticised it. The band supported the album with the War Tour through the end of 1983. In 2012, the album was ranked 223rd on Rolling Stones list of "The 500 Greatest Albums of All Time". In 2008, a remastered edition of War was released.

Recording
In August 1982, Bono and Ali honeymooned in Jamaica. It has been noted that it was not a typical honeymoon, as Bono reportedly worked on the lyrics for the upcoming album. The lyrics to "New Year's Day" had its origins in a love song Bono wrote for his wife, but the song was reshaped and inspired by the Polish Solidarity movement. The band began recording the album in September 1982 at Windmill Lane Studios in Dublin with producer Steve Lillywhite, their third consecutive record at the studio with the producer.

The album's opener, "Sunday Bloody Sunday", an ardent protest song, stems from a guitar riff and lyric written by the Edge in 1982. Following an argument with his girlfriend, and a period of doubt in his own song-writing abilities, the Edge – "feeling depressed... channeled [his] fear and frustration and self-loathing into a piece of music." Early versions of the song opened with the line, "Don't talk to me about the rights of the IRA, UDA". After Bono had reworked the lyrics, the band recorded the song.  The opening drum pattern soon developed into the song's hook. A local violinist, Steve Wickham, approached the Edge one morning at a bus stop and asked if U2 had any need for a violin on their next album. In the studio for only half a day, Wickham's electric violin became the final instrumental contribution to the song.

During the sessions for "Sunday Bloody Sunday", Lillywhite encouraged drummer Larry Mullen, Jr. to use a click track, but Mullen was firmly against the idea. A chance meeting with Andy Newmark (of Sly & the Family Stone) – a drummer who used a click track religiously – changed Mullen's mind.  Mullen used the click track to stay in time for other songs on the album. Mullen said of the album in a 1983 interview, "I think the drumming has always been pretty simple, I don't think it needs to be flashy. For War I use a click track, something I haven't used before, it's a way of keeping time in my headphones. When I listened to the music in time with the click track I knew I had to bring it down to the real basics. Hopefully for the next LP it will be more complicated, I'll move on. I think of it as a musical progression for myself because I learned a lot recording this album, just about my own style and that's what I wanted to do. I think there is a definite style on War where there isn't on the previous albums."

Three of the tracks featured backing vocals by the Coconuts, of Kid Creole and the Coconuts. In the words of Steve Lillywhite, "they just happened to be in Dublin on tour, so we hung out with them and they came in and sang on 'Surrender'. So it was sort of random – this serious Irish rock band having the Coconuts on their album."

The studio version of "40" was recorded during the final hours of the recording sessions in November 1982. Bassist Adam Clayton had already left the studio, and the three remaining band members decided they did not have a good song to end the album. Bono, the Edge, and Mullen Jr. quickly recorded the song with the Edge playing both the guitar and bass parts. Bono called the song "40" as he based the lyrics on Psalm 40. In live versions of the song, the Edge and Clayton switch roles, as Clayton plays guitar and Edge plays the bass.

Composition
The sound of War is arguably harsher than that of the band's other albums. A major reason for this is that the Edge uses far less delay and echo than in previous and subsequent works.

War opens with the protest song "Sunday Bloody Sunday". The song describes the horror felt by an observer of The Troubles in Northern Ireland, specifically Bloody Sunday. Already a departure from the themes of innocence and spirituality displayed on the group's first two albums, "Sunday Bloody Sunday" introduces the album with a startling, military-esque drum beat by Larry Mullen, Jr., a fuming solo by the Edge that segues into staccato bursts reminiscent of machine gun fire, and pointed lyrical couplets such as:  "And today the millions cry / We eat and drink while tomorrow they die." The album as a whole is more direct than the ambient October.  Bono said in 1983, 

"Sunday Bloody Sunday" is considered to be among the greatest political protest songs, and has remained a staple of U2's live concerts in the years since.

"Seconds" is a song about nuclear proliferation, and the possibility that Armageddon could occur by an accident. The track contains a sample from the 1982 documentary Soldier Girls. The Edge sings the first two stanzas, making it one of the rare occasions on which he sings lead vocals.

In continuing the political motif of the album, "New Year's Day" is about the Polish solidarity movement. In 2004, Rolling Stone placed it as the 435th greatest song of all time. The song remains a staple of the band's live set, and is their third-most frequently performed song behind "I Will Follow" and "Pride (In the Name of Love)".

"Like a Song..." was intended as a message to those who believed that the band was too worthy, sincere and not "punk" enough. Bono speculated that the song's punk attitude would have made more sense in the 1950s and 1960s, as opposed to the "dressing up" of the genre in the early 1980s. "Like a Song..." was only played live once.

"Drowning Man" is the fifth track on the album. Its sound is a departure from the other tracks in War as it is a quiet, atmospheric song heavily influenced by the work of the Comsat Angels. It was never performed live, although there are also unconfirmed reports that it was performed at a concert in 1983.

Other songs concern topics such as prostitution ("Red Light") and love ("Two Hearts Beat as One").

Release
The album was first released on 28 February 1983. The original cassette release contains the entire album on each side.

Packaging and title
The album was titled War for several reasons; in 1982, Bono said, "War seemed to be the motif for 1982," adding that "Everywhere you looked, from the Falklands to the Middle East and South Africa, there was war. By calling the album War we're giving people a slap in the face and at the same time getting away from the cosy image a lot of people have of U2."  The Edge said that "It's a heavy title. It's blunt. It's not something that's safe, so it could backfire. It's the sort of subject matter that people can really take a dislike to. But we wanted to take a more dangerous course, fly a bit closer to the wind, so I think the title is appropriate." The boy on the cover is Peter Rowen (brother of Bono's friend, Guggi). He also appears on the covers of Boy, Three, The Best of 1980–1990, Early Demos and many singles. Bono described the reasoning behind the cover: "Instead of putting tanks and guns on the cover, we've put a child's face. War can also be a mental thing, an emotional thing between loves. It doesn't have to be a physical thing."

Singles
In , "New Year's Day" was released internationally as the album's lead single. The single reached the top ten in the UK, and was the first release by the band to chart on the Billboard Hot 100. In March 1983, "Two Hearts Beat as One" and "Sunday Bloody Sunday" were released as singles in different regions. "Two Hearts Beat as One", a single in the US, UK, and Australia, reached number 18 on the UK Singles Chart; "Sunday Bloody Sunday", released in Germany and the Netherlands, reached number 3 on the Netherlands' charts. "40" was not released as a commercial single, but rather as a promotional single in Germany.

Reception

In a favourable review in Rolling Stone, J. D. Considine said, "the album's musical strengths are largely the product of well-honed arrangements and carefully balanced dynamics". He added, "the songs here stand up against anything on the Clash's London Calling in terms of sheer impact, and the fact that U2 can sweep the listener up in the same sort of enthusiastic romanticism that fuels the band's grand gestures is an impressive feat. For once, not having all the answers seems a bonus." Critic Dave Marsh said that despite not "match[ing] the pure chilling intensity" of Boy and Lillywhite's production not giving the guitars enough prominence, War was a "solid set". He complimented War for its "passion and commitment" and potent songs, calling it "as good as any post-new wave rock around". He concluded, "It's rare to see a band sustain such courageous behavior through three albums and still wind up on the brink of stardom." Robert Christgau of The Village Voice wrote that "the deadly European virus that's always tainted this band turns out to be their characteristic melodic device", adding, "The Edge becomes a tuneful guitarist by the simple expedient of not soloing, and if Bono has too many Gregorian moments his conviction still carries the music." Dan Kennedy of the Orlando Sentinel said that on War the group "more clearly define its philosophical stance" and that below the sense of despair on the surface is a "voice of hope that flies in the face of most rock postures".

Brett Milano of The Boston Globe called War an "album of tension and conflict", with a "riveting opening" in "Sunday Bloody Sunday" and "one of the year's most affecting love songs" in "Two Hearts Beat as One". He said the "arrangements are models of invention" and that the Edge's "expressive guitar is still the heart of U2's sound". Milano found the only weakness to be the "anti-climactic acoustic songs" that close each side. In a review published in the Albuquerque Journal, Rick Shefchik said, "The arrangements on this precocious young band's third album are brighter than before", giving their politically motivated songs a "pop sound they once seemed to be avoiding". Bill Ashton of the Miami Herald called War one the year's best records and said it was the band's "most consistent album yet, full of plaintive lyrics and fiery guitar work" and a rhythm section that "sharpened noticeably" since October. He complimented the lyrics for never being heavy-handed despite touching on "revolution, life in the age of The Bomb, love and faith". Philip Smith of The New Zealand Herald commended the band's maturing sound and labeled the album "a classic". He concluded his review, "So U2 have set out to make a big statement on a subject close to the Irishmen's hearts – and they have succeeded." Terry Atkinson of the Los Angeles Times was disappointed by the "gradual dissolution of [U2's] sound" and found that only the two songs that "hold to the group's established style" ("Sunday Bloody Sunday" and "New Year's Day") were "thoroughly satisfying". The review concluded, "In trying to escape formula, U-2 too often loses the battle, but this willingness to try the new, added to its still-bracing basic thrust, indicates how distinctive the band is even in failure."

Several reviews were negative in the United Kingdom. Gavin Martin of NME compared the album to U2's debut, stating that "where Boy shone and flowed War is dull and static", and "where Boy propelled lucid pellets of fire and imagination War cranks out blank liberal awareness"; he felt that after the single "New Year's Day", which he considered to be "their finest single since 'I Will Follow'", War "declines quite dramatically", ultimately calling the album "another example of rock music's impotence and decay". Dave McCullough of Sounds shared a similar point of view, recognising that the two singles were "by far the strongest tracks" on War, but that "for the remainder, they are a (dejected sounding) mixture of the incomplete, the experimental (in the simplest sense) and the plain sub-standard." By contrast, Liam Mackey of Hot Press in the band's native Ireland said that War "totally eclipses" the group's first two albums and called it a "major leap forward, conceptually and technically". He praised the "resourcefulness and imagination" of the Edge's guitar playing and said the album "offers watertight evidence of the band's standing as a genuinely original force in contemporary music".

War was a commercial success, becoming U2's first number-one album in the UK and supplanting Michael Jackson's Thriller at the top of the charts. The album placed sixth on The Village Voices 1983 year-end Pazz & Jop critics' poll.

War Tour

In support of the album, the band began touring on 1 December 1982. The first month of shows, referred to as the "Pre-War Tour", preceded the album's release and the bulk of the tour, and was meant to showcase and test the new songs in a live setting. The War Tour proper began on 26 February 1983 and lasted until 30 November of that year. In total, the band played 110 gigs in Europe, the US, and Japan to promote War. Over the course of the tour, the band began to play progressively larger venues, moving from clubs to halls to arenas. Bono attempted to engage the growing audiences with theatrical, often dangerous antics, climbing scaffoldings and lighting rigs and jumping into the audience. The sight of Bono waving a white flag during performances of "Sunday Bloody Sunday" became the tour's iconic image. The band played several dates at large European and American music festivals, including a performance at the US Festival on Memorial Day weekend for an audience of 125,000 people. The group's 5 June 1983 concert at Red Rocks Amphitheatre on a rain-soaked evening was singled out by Rolling Stone as one "50 Moments that Changed the History of Rock and Roll". The show was recorded for the concert video Live at Red Rocks and was one of several concerts from the tour captured on their live album Under a Blood Red Sky. Both releases received extensive play on the radio and MTV, expanding the band's audience and showcasing their prowess as a live act. During the tour, the group established a new tradition by closing concerts with "40", during which the Edge and Clayton would switch instruments and the band members would leave the stage one-by-one as the crowd continued to sing the refrain "How long to sing this song?". The War Tour was U2's first profitable tour, grossing about $2 million.

Legacy

In 1989, War was ranked number 40 on Rolling Stones list of "The 100 Greatest Albums of the '80s". In 2003, the magazine ranked War 221st on its list of "The 500 Greatest Albums of All Time", describing it as "the band's most overtly political album... charged with explosive, passionate guitar rock". An updated version of the list in 2012 re-ranked the album at number 223. Slant Magazine ranked War 94th on its list of the "Best Albums of the 1980s."

Chicago Tribune critic Greg Kot deemed War a "breakthrough" for U2 in which "the band's passion comes through with gripping clarity." Stephen Thomas Erlewine of AllMusic viewed it as U2's first album to achieve "greatness", finding that their lyrics – which he said "came across as grandstanding" in U2's earlier work – cohered into a "remarkably clear" vision on War and, complemented by the band's "muscular, forceful performances", succeed at "making the universal sound personal". J. D. Considine and Nathan Brackett's overview of U2's discography in the 2004 edition of The Rolling Stone Album Guide states that with War, the band brought more focus to their songwriting and effectively balanced personal and political subject matter, while also creating a musically "richer and more varied" album than October.

Reviewing War upon its 2008 reissue, Blenders Jon Dolan opined that it marked a tonal shift from U2's more "inwardly focused" previous albums and demonstrated the band's newfound "titanic moral and sonic force", while Rolling Stones David Fricke commented that on War, "U2 sound like stars, not aspirants, ready for their money shot". Steven Hyden, writing for The A.V. Club, said that the album showed Bono's mastery of "the art of the grand symbolic gesture" through "his inspirational iconography on anthems like 'Sunday Bloody Sunday' and 'New Year's Day'". Pitchfork reviewer Joe Tangari concluded, "The U2 we've known ever since had arrived on War, and even today it sounds vital."

According to Treble writer Jeff Terich, War served as "a triumphant close to [U2's] post-punk trilogy" and "the dividing line between U2, the young Dublin new wave act and U2, the heroic stadium rock band". In a dissenting analysis, Bob Stanley believed the band had actually deviated from post-punk's regionalism and rejection of pop music universality by achieving progressively higher levels of international success. He wrote that, beginning with War, "it became increasingly hard to tell what U2 stood for, or what their purpose was – their vastness and their complete avoidance of detail made them hard to read, let alone love. One day someone will explain to Bono that pop is always more expressive when it is trying to mend a broken heart than when it's trying to save the world."

Track listing

In 1993, Mobile Fidelity Sound Lab remastered the album from the original analog master tapes and released it on a 24kt gold plated CD. The original master recording has slightly different running times:
"Seconds" runs 3:22, adding 11.5 seconds in the break section (beginning at approx. 2:01)
"New Year's Day" runs 5:38, leaving in the one measure before the guitar break (beginning at approx. 3:27)
"Like a Song..." runs 5:00, extending the playout section (beginning at approx. 4:45)
"Surrender" runs 5:34, but is erroneously identified on the back of the album as being 6:01 in length

2008 remastered edition
Following the remastered re-release of The Joshua Tree in 2007, it was rumoured that the band would also remaster and re-release War, along with the albums Boy and October. It was released in three different formats:

Standard format: A single CD with re-mastered audio and restored packaging. Includes a 16-page booklet featuring previously unseen photos, full lyrics and new liner notes by Niall Stokes. The 10-tracks match the previous release of the album.
Deluxe format: A standard CD (as above) and a bonus CD. Bonus CD includes b-sides, live tracks and rarities. Also includes a 32-page booklet with previously unseen photos, full lyrics, new liner notes by Niall Stokes, and explanatory notes on the bonus material by the Edge.
Vinyl format: A single album re-mastered version on 180 gram vinyl with restored packaging.

Bonus CD

Personnel
U2
Bono – lead vocals, guitar
The Edge – guitar, piano, lap steel guitar, backing vocals, lead vocals on "Seconds" (bass guitar on "40"; uncredited on the album)
Adam Clayton – bass guitar (except "40"; still credited on the album)
Larry Mullen Jr. – drums, percussion

Additional personnel
Kenny Fradley – trumpet on "Red Light"
Steve Wickham – electric violin on "Sunday Bloody Sunday" and "Drowning Man"
The Coconuts: Cheryl Poirier, Adriana Kaegi, Taryn Hagey, Jessica Felton – backing vocals on "Like a Song...", "Red Light", and "Surrender"

Charts

Weekly album charts

Weekly song charts

Certifications

See also
List of covers of U2 songs – Drowning Man
List of covers of U2 songs – Like a Song...
U2 discography

References
Footnotes

Bibliography

External links
War on U2.com

1983 albums
Albums produced by Steve Lillywhite
Island Records albums
U2 albums